Guillaume Chavard (23 July 1911 – 9 December 1973) was a French racing cyclist. He rode in the 1936 Tour de France.

References

1911 births
1973 deaths
French male cyclists
Place of birth missing